Lithacodia is a genus of moths of the family Noctuidae.

Species

Lithacodia albannularis 
Lithacodia albiclava 
Lithacodia albidula 
Lithacodia albitornata 
Lithacodia albopunctalis 
Lithacodia altitudinis 
Lithacodia armilla 
Lithacodia atrinotata 
Lithacodia aurata 
Lithacodia awassensis 
Lithacodia benita 
Lithacodia biaccentuata 
Lithacodia binorbis 
Lithacodia bitrigonophora 
Lithacodia bryistis 
Lithacodia caffristis 
Lithacodia chloromixta 
Lithacodia chlorophila 
Lithacodia cidarioides 
Lithacodia clandestina 
Lithacodia confusa 
Lithacodia costaricana 
Lithacodia crotopha 
Lithacodia cuprea 
Lithacodia cupreofusca 
Lithacodia cupreofuscoides 
Lithacodia deceptoria 
Lithacodia decorata 
Lithacodia decorina 
Lithacodia delicatula 
Lithacodia digitalis 
Lithacodia dorata 
Lithacodia editha 
Lithacodia elaeostygia 
Lithacodia euchroa 
Lithacodia externa 
Lithacodia fentoni 
Lithacodia flavofimbria 
Lithacodia folium 
Lithacodia geoga 
Lithacodia glaucopis 
Lithacodia gracilior 
Lithacodia griseifusa 
Lithacodia griseomixta 
Lithacodia holophaea 
Lithacodia homopteridia 
Lithacodia idiostygia 
Lithacodia indeterminata 
Lithacodia jora 
Lithacodia larentiformis 
Lithacodia larentioides 
Lithacodia mabillei 
Lithacodia macrouncina 
Lithacodia mandarina 
Lithacodia martynovi 
Lithacodia melanostigma 
Lithacodia mella 
Lithacodia merta 
Lithacodia mesomela 
Lithacodia mesophoenica 
Lithacodia mesoplaga 
Lithacodia metachrysa 
Lithacodia micronephra Hampson 1910
Lithacodia minuta 
Lithacodia minutipuncta 
Lithacodia mirella 
Lithacodia monorbis 
Lithacodia muscosula 
Lithacodia mustapha 
Lithacodia mysteriosa 
Lithacodia nemorum 
Lithacodia nivata 
Lithacodia normalis 
Lithacodia octogintaocto 
Lithacodia olivella 
Lithacodia onytes 
Lithacodia penthis 
Lithacodia persubtilis 
Lithacodia phya 
Lithacodia picatina 
Lithacodia picta 
Lithacodia plumbifusa 
Lithacodia polita 
Lithacodia postivitta 
Lithacodia potens 
Lithacodia praeapicilinea 
Lithacodia pyrophora 
Lithacodia quadriorbis 
Lithacodia roseopicta 
Lithacodia rubrilis 
Lithacodia ruvida 
Lithacodia scapha 
Lithacodia shansiensis 
Lithacodia sirbena 
Lithacodia squalida 
Lithacodia stygia 
Lithacodia stygiodes 
Lithacodia substellata 
Lithacodia superior 
Lithacodia syggenes 
Lithacodia taiwana 
Lithacodia tetratrigona 
Lithacodia trifurca 
Lithacodia triocellata 
Lithacodia uncula 
Lithacodia unguapicata 
Lithacodia varicolora 
Lithacodia variicolor 
Lithacodia varioplagata 
Lithacodia veternosa 
Lithacodia vexillifera 
Lithacodia viridovata 
Lithacodia walta 
Lithacodia wiskotti 
Lithacodia xemiloca 

Species brought into synonymy
Lithacodia blandula: synonym of Maliattha blandula (Guenée, 1862)
Lithacodia brunnea: synonym of Pseudodeltote brunnea 
Lithacodia coenia: synonym of Pseudodeltote coenia 
Lithacodia distinguenda: synonym of Protodeltote distinguenda 
Lithacodia falsa: synonym of Koyaga falsa 
Lithacodia formosana: synonym of Pseudodeltote formosana 
Lithacodia glauca: synonym of Deltote glauca 
Lithacodia musta: synonym of Deltote musta 
Lithacodia numisma: synonym of Koyaga numisma 
Lithacodia subcoenia: synonym of Pseudodeltote subcoenia 
Lithacodia virescens: synonym of Koyaga virescens 
Lithacodia viriditincta: synonym of Koyaga viriditincta

Notes

References

Natural History Museum Lepidoptera genus database

Eustrotiinae